Gymnoscelis phoenicopus is a moth in the family Geometridae. It was described by Prout in 1958. It is found on Seram, Sulawesi and Borneo. The habitat consists of lower montane forests.

The wings are uniform brown with fine black postmedials on both wings, edged finely paler distad. The forewing discal spot and antemedial line are also present.

References

Moths described in 1958
phoenicopus